Patrick Joseph Kennedy (January 14, 1858 – May 18, 1929) was an American businessman and politician from Boston, Massachusetts. He and his wife Mary were the parents of four children, including future U.S. Securities and Exchange Commission Chair and U.S. Ambassador to the United Kingdom Joseph P. Kennedy Sr. Their grandchildren through Joseph include U.S. President John F. Kennedy, U.S. Attorney General and U.S. Senator Robert F. Kennedy, and longtime U.S. Senator Ted Kennedy.

After cholera killed his father and brother, Kennedy was the only surviving male in his family. He started work at age fourteen and became a successful businessman, later owning three saloons and a whisky import house. Eventually, he had major interests in coal and banking as well. Kennedy was a major figure in the Democratic Party in Boston. Though he served in both the Massachusetts House of Representatives and the state Senate, he preferred to play a behind-the-scenes role as a party boss.

Early life 

Patrick Joseph Kennedy was born on January 14, 1858, in Boston, Massachusetts. He was the youngest of five children born to Patrick Kennedy (1823-1858) and Bridget Kennedy (née Murphy) (1824-1888). His parents were Irish Catholic immigrants who were both from New Ross, County Wexford. The couple's elder son John had died of cholera in infancy two years before Kennedy was born. Ten months after Kennedy's birth, his father Patrick also succumbed to the infectious epidemic that infested the family's East Boston neighborhood. As the only surviving male, Kennedy was the first family member to receive a formal education. His mother Bridget had purchased an East Boston stationery and notions store where she had worked. The business took off and expanded into a grocery and liquor store.

At the age of fourteen, young Kennedy left school (just below high school) to work with his mother and three older sisters, Mary, Joanna, and Margaret, as a stevedore on the Boston docks. In the 1880s, with money he had saved from his modest earnings and help from his mother Bridget, he launched a business career by buying a saloon in Haymarket Square neighborhood near downtown (not the more famous site of a labor demonstration and bombing in Chicago in the 1880s.) In time, he bought a second establishment by the East Boston docks. Next, to capitalize on the social drinking of upper-class Bostonians, Kennedy purchased a third bar in an upscale East Boston hotel, the Maverick House. Before he was thirty, his growing prosperity allowed him to buy a whiskey-importing business.

Marriage and children 
On November 23, 1887, Kennedy married Mary Augusta Hickey (December 6, 1857 – May 6, 1923), daughter of James Hickey and Margaret Martha Field. The couple had four children and remained married until Hickey's death in May 1923.  His wealth afforded his family a home on Jeffries Point in East Boston.

Political career 

Kennedy was "always ready to help less fortunate fellow Irishmen with a little cash and some sensible advice." He enjoyed the approval and respect of most folks in East Boston, living on the hill of a mixed classes and income Boston neighborhood of upscale Irish and Protestant elite. A sociable man able to mix comfortably with both the Roman Catholic and the Protestant elite, he moved successfully into politics. Beginning in 1884, he converted his popularity into service as a Democrat, a minority in the then Republican dominant power in the Massachusetts General Court. He served five consecutive one-year terms in the Massachusetts House of Representatives, followed by three two-year terms in the upper chamber in the Massachusetts Senate. Establishing himself as one of Boston's principal Democratic leaders, he gave one of the seconding speeches for incumbent President Grover Cleveland at the party's 1888 national convention of the party in St. Louis. However, he found campaigning, speech making, and legislative maneuvering, to be less appealing than the behind-the-scenes machinations that characterized so much of Boston politics in the late-nineteenth and early-twentieth centuries. After leaving the Senate and the General Court after many terms in 1895, Kennedy spent the rest of his political career as an appointed elections commissioner, an appointed city fire commissioner, as the backroom boss of Boston's Ward Two, and as a member of his party's unofficial Board of Strategy.

Death 
By the time of his death in 1929, Kennedy held an interest in a coal company and a substantial amount of stock in a bank, the Columbia Trust Company.

In his later years, Kennedy developed degenerative liver disease. In April 1929, he was admitted to Deaconess Hospital to receive treatment. He died there on May 18 at the age of 71. His funeral was held at St. John the Evangelist Church in Winthrop, Massachusetts, on May 21. The Boston Globe reported that hundreds of mourners lined the streets to watch Kennedy's funeral procession and businesses in East Boston closed to honor him. Kennedy is buried in Holy Cross Cemetery in Malden, Massachusetts.

Legacy 
In 1914, P.J. Kennedy's son Joseph married Rose Fitzgerald (July 22, 1890 – January 22, 1995), the eldest daughter of Boston Mayor John F. Fitzgerald (1863–1950). Joseph P. Kennedy Sr. went on to become a U.S. Securities and Exchange Commission Chair and a U.S. Ambassador to the United Kingdom.

Joseph and Rose Kennedy had nine children, including World War II casualty Joseph P. Kennedy Jr., U.S. President John F. Kennedy, Attorney General of the United States and U.S. Senator Robert F. Kennedy, and U.S. Senator Ted Kennedy.

References

1858 births
1929 deaths
19th-century American businesspeople
20th-century American businesspeople
American people of Irish descent
Burials in Massachusetts
Businesspeople from Boston
Deaths from liver disease
P. J.
Democratic Party Massachusetts state senators
Democratic Party members of the Massachusetts House of Representatives
Politicians from Boston